Deutsche Gesellschaft für Akustik e.V. (DEGA) (German society for acoustics) was established 1988 to promote research and application of acoustics.

DEGA is a member of the European Acoustics Association (EAA), the International Commission for Acoustics (ICA) and the  International Institute of Noise Control Engineering (I-INCE). It has about 2.000 members (2020).

DEGA is the organizer of the annual German acoustics conference Deutsche Jahrestagung für Akustik (DAGA) in March. First DAGA was held in 1970 by the Deutsche Arbeitsgemeinschaft für Akustik.

Helmholtz-Medaille
 1991 Eberhard Zwicker (posthum)
 1993 Gerhard M. Sessler
 1994 Wolfgang Kraak
 1995 Manfred R. Schroeder
 1996 Heinrich Kuttruff
 1997 Fridolin P. Mechel and Manfred Heckl (posthum)
 1999 Helmut A. Müller
 2000 Arno Lenk
 2001 Jens Blauert
 2002 Karl Gösele
 2003 Wolfgang Eisenmenger
 2004 Jürgen Meyer
 2005 Volker Mellert
 2006 Ernst Terhardt
 2007 Werner Schirmer
 2008 Frank J. Fahy
 2009 Peter Költzsch
 2010 Hugo Fastl
 2011 Judith Lang
 2012 Wolfgang Fasold
 2013 Werner Lauterborn
 2014 Michael Möser
 2015 Lothar Gaul
 2016 Joachim Scheuren
 2017 Armin Kohlrausch
 2018 Wolfgang Ahnert
 2019 Diemer de Vries and Sonoko Kuwano
 2020 Reinhard Lerch

References

Scientific organisations based in Germany
Organizations established in 1988
1988 establishments in Germany